Masterpiece is a 1973 album by The Temptations for the Gordy (Motown) label, produced and written by Norman Whitfield.

Overview
The title refers to the album being not the group's intended masterpiece, but Norman Whitfield's. Having already produced songs for the Temptations such as "Smiling Faces Sometimes" and "Papa Was a Rollin' Stone" which emphasized his instrumental tracks over the group's vocals, Whitfield goes one step further here.

The title track, at nearly 14 minutes long, includes only three minutes of vocals from the group, who all share sections of the lead vocal. "Masterpiece" shares space on side one with "Hey Girl (I Like Your Style)", a slow classic-styled ballad led by Richard Street which opens the album. Side two of the LP opens with "Ma", an ode to a hillbilly mother led by Street, Damon Harris, and Melvin Franklin, which was recorded as the title track of Rare Earth's 1973 Whitfield-produced LP. "Law of the Land", led by Dennis Edwards, Street, and Harris, was recorded the same year by The Undisputed Truth. The song is a message track in the tradition of "Don't Let the Joneses Get You Down" from Puzzle People. "Plastic Man", with its lead vocal shared between Edwards, Harris, Franklin and Street, disparages "plastic people" who operate in backhanded ways, while the eight-minute album closer, "Hurry Tomorrow", is a solo spot for Harris, which explores a hallucinogenic drug trip.

Many critics, and the Temptations themselves, remarked that much of Masterpiece, and especially its title track, sounded like a Norman Whitfield/Funk Brothers solo recording featuring supporting vocals by the Temptations. Fans complained directly to the Temptations themselves, and some music journalists began snidely referring to the Temptations as "The Norman Whitfield Chorale Singers" and other such names. Masterpiece proved to be Whitfield's penultimate album with the Temptations; after producing their album 1990 later in 1973, he left Motown to form his own record label.

Despite the criticism directed towards the LP, "Masterpiece" became a #1 hit on the Billboard R&B singles chart, and a #7 hit on the Billboard Hot 100. Its follow-up, the "Papa Was a Rolling Stone"-like "Plastic Man", hit #40 on the Billboard Hot 100. "Hey Girl (I Like Your Style)" also became a Top 40 hit in the late summer/early fall of 1973. "Law of the Land" was released as a UK-only single by Tamla Motown, and just missed out on the UK Top 40, peaking at #41 in late 1973.

Masterpiece was the final Temptations LP recorded in Detroit at Motown's Hitsville U.S.A. studio. By 1973, Motown Records had completed its migration to Hollywood, California, and beginning with the next release, 1990, the Temptations would record in Los Angeles-area studios.

Track listing
All selections written and produced by Norman Whitfield.

Side one
"Hey Girl (I Like Your Style)" – 4:36 (lead singer: Richard Street)
"Masterpiece" – 13:49 (lead singers: Dennis Edwards, Otis Williams, Richard Street, Damon Harris, Melvin Franklin)

Side two
"Ma" – 4:46 (lead singers: Richard Street, Damon Harris, Melvin Franklin)
"Law of the Land" – 5:08 (lead singers: Dennis Edwards, Damon Harris, Richard Street)
"Plastic Man" – 5:53 (lead singers: Dennis Edwards, Damon Harris, Melvin Franklin, Richard Street)
"Hurry Tomorrow" – 8:06 (lead singer: Damon Harris)

Personnel

Singles history
"Masterpiece" (Vocal)
Gordy single 7126, February 1, 1973; *B-side: "Masterpiece" (Instrumental)
"Plastic Man"
Gordy single 7129, May 10, 1973; B-side: "Hurry Tomorrow"
"Hey Girl (I Like Your Style)"
Gordy single 7131, July 24, 1973; B-side: "Ma"
"Law of the Land"
Tamla-Motown single TMG-866, 1973 (UK only); B-side: "Run Charlie Run" (from All Directions)

Charts

Album

Year-end charts

Singles

See also
List of number-one R&B albums of 1973 (U.S.)

References

1973 albums
The Temptations albums
Gordy Records albums
Albums arranged by Paul Riser
Albums produced by Norman Whitfield
Albums recorded at Hitsville U.S.A.